Yevgeny Rybakov (born 27 February 1985) is a Russian long-distance runner who competes in the track and road events. His twin brother, Anatoly, is also a long-distance runner.

Rybakov won the bronze medal at the 2012 European Athletics Championships in Helsinki at the 10,000 metres event.

Competition record

References

External links 
 

1985 births
Living people
Russian male long-distance runners
Russian male cross country runners
Universiade medalists in athletics (track and field)
Universiade silver medalists for Russia
Universiade bronze medalists for Russia
Russian Athletics Championships winners
Medalists at the 2011 Summer Universiade
Medalists at the 2013 Summer Universiade
World Athletics Championships athletes for Russia
European Athletics Championships medalists